The Albarregas Roman bridge (Spanish: Puente Romano sobre El Albarregas) is a Roman bridge located in Mérida, Spain. The bridge, which is built of granite, crosses the river Albarregas, a tributary of the Guadiana. It is part of the Vía de la Plata.

It has been protected since 1912. It is a Bien de Interés Cultural and part of a World Heritage Site.

See also 
 List of Bien de Interés Cultural in the Province of Badajoz

References

External links 

 

Roman bridges in Spain
History of Extremadura
Bien de Interés Cultural landmarks in the Province of Badajoz
Bridges in Mérida, Spain